Messers Run is a tributary of Catawissa Creek in Schuylkill County, Pennsylvania, in the United States. The only named tributary of the stream is Negro Hollow, but it has two unnamed tributaries. The creek has some alkalinity, but is slightly acidic. The main rock formations in the watershed of it are the Mauch Chunk Formation and the Pottsville Formation. The main soils in the watershed are the Leck Kill soil and the Hazleton soil.

There are two reservoirs on the stream. It is difficult to access the stream as most of it is several hundred meters from any road. The creek is a High-Quality Coldwater Fishery and Class A Wild Trout Waters in some places. There are many species of fish inhabiting the creek, including brook, brown trout, and others. The creek has been surveyed by the Pennsylvania Fish and Boat Commission.

Course
It begins near Interstate 81 on a mountain known as Spring Mountain in Kline Township. It flows southwest for several tenths of a mile before entering a valley and turning west-southwest. After approximately a mile, the stream passes through the Lofty Reservoir. It exits the Lofty Reservoir via the reservoir's southwestern edge and continues west and slightly south. After more than a mile, it turns west and slightly north, receiving an unnamed tributary several tenths of a mile downstream. The stream then continues west, receiving another unnamed tributary after several tenths of a mile. A few tenths of a mile later, it exits Kline Township and enters East Union Township. In East Union Township, the stream turns northwest and receives the tributary Negro Hollow. It then turns northeast for a few hundred feet and passes near the Blue Head Reservoir. The stream then turns northwest and flows for slightly less than a mile until it reaches its confluence with Catawissa Creek.

Tributaries
Messers Run has three tributaries, only one of which is named. The named tributary is known as Negro Hollow and it flows through Delano Township, Kline Township, and East Union Township. The unnamed tributaries are known as "Trib 27610 To Messers Run" and "Trib 27609 To Messers Run". The former is entirely in Kline Township, while the latter flows through Delano Township and Kline Township.

Hydrology
Messers Run is infertile and acidic upstream of the Lofty Reservoir. The stream has the potential to be affected by acid precipitation in this part of it. The stream also has these attributes from the Lofty Reservoir downstream to the Blue Head Reservoir and from the Blue Head Reservoir downstream to the mouth.

The pH of Messers Run upstream of the Lofty Reservoir is 6.3. The total concentration of alkalinity in this part of the stream is 3 milligrams per liter. These values are similar to those measured in a similar area during a 1990 survey of the stream. The concentration of water hardness in this part of the stream is 47 milligrams per liter. A 1997 report noted that this value was very high considering the concentration of alkalinity.

The pH of Messers Run between the Lofty Reservoir and the Blue Head Reservoir is 6.6. The concentration of alkalinity in this portion of the stream is 4 milligrams per liter and the total water hardness is 18 milligrams per liter. The pH of the stream below the Blue Head Reservoir is 6.6. The concentration of alkalinity in this part of the stream is 5 milligrams per liter and the water hardness is 13 milligrams per liter.

The water temperature at this time and location was measured to be .

Geography and geology

Most of the watershed of Messers Run is on rock of the Mauch Chunk Formation. This rock formation consists of siltstone, sandstone, grayish-red shale, and conglomerate. However, areas that are on the Pottsville Formation are scattered throughout the watershed, mainly along its southern and northern edges. This rock formation is especially common in the sub-watershed of Negro Hollow and near the upper reaches of "Trib 27609 To Messers Run". The Pottsville Formation contains claystone, limestone, conglomerate, shale, and gray sandstone.

The main soils in the watershed of Messers Run are the Leck Kill soil and the Hazleton soil. The Leck Kill soil occurs in the northwestern part of the watershed (in its lower reaches). The Hazleton soil is found throughout the rest of the watershed.

Messers Run is flanked by areas prone to flooding during a 100 year flood from the mouth of Negro Hollow upstream to its headwaters. Negro Hollow and its unnamed tributaries are also surrounded by areas prone to flooding during a 100-year flood for much of their length. Both of the unnamed tributaries of Messers Run are surrounded by such areas for the majority of their length.

A mountain known as Spring Mountain is at the headwaters of Messers Run. A mountain known as Locust Mountain is also found in the watershed.

Watershed and history
The stream passes through the United States Geological Survey quadrangles of Conyngham and Delano. Much of the watershed is in Kline Township. However, significant areas in the western part of the watershed are in East union Township, Delano Township, and Mahanoy Township. Interstate 81 passes through the watershed in its easternmost part.

A reservoir known as the Lofty Reservoir is situated on Messers Run. It is owned by the Pennsylvania Game Commission and is used as a supply of drinking water. Additionally, the Blue Head Reservoir is in the watershed.

There is some agricultural land in the lower reaches of the watershed of Messers Run. A large part of the watershed is on land that is part of a Nature Conservancy Priority Forest Hub. The stream flows through Pennsylvania State Game Lands Number 308 for most of its length. The watershed of the stream is almost entirely on forested land.

Between the Lofty Reservoir and the Blue Head Reservoir, Messers Run is mostly accessible by State Game Lands roads, which are only open seasonally. It is also difficult to access the stream upstream of the Lofty Reservoir or downstream of the Blue Head Reservoir. No part of Messers Run upstream of the Lofty Reservoir is within  of a road. 18 percent of the stream's length between the Lofty Reservoir and the Blue Head Reservoir is within  of a road, 95 percent is within  of a road, and 100 percent is within  of one. 16 percent of its length between the Blue Head Reservoir and the mouth is within  of a road, 23 percent is within  of a road, and 31 percent is within  of one.

In 1990, the population density of the watershed of Messers Run upstream of the Lofty Reservoir was 140 people per square mile (54 people per square kilometer). The population density of the watershed between the Lofty and Blue Head Reservoirs was 80 people per square mile (31 people per square kilometer). The population density of the watershed downstream of the Blue Head Reservoir was 52 people per square mile (20 people per square kilometer).

The Mahanoy Water Company sought permission to construct a dam on Messers Run as early as 1913. The stream was used as a water supply as early as the early 1900s. Messers Run was surveyed once by the environmental services branch of the Pennsylvania Fish and Boat Commission. This survey was carried out by Young in November 1990.

Biology

Messers Run is considered by the Pennsylvania Department of Environmental Protection to be a High-Quality Coldwater Fishery, as is its tributary Negro Hollow. Both Messers Run (from Lofty Reservoir downstream to Blue Head Reservoir) and Negro Hollow (between its headwaters and its mouth) are also considered by the Pennsylvania Fish and Boat Commission to be Class A Wild Trout Waters. A 1997 report advised against stocking Messers Run.

Seven species of fish inhabit Messers Run. These include a highly substantial population of brook trout. Upstream of the Lofty Reservoir, there are two species of fish inhabiting the stream: brook trout, eastern blacknose dace. The 1990 survey observed these two species as well as white suckers and pumpkinseeds. Three species of fish inhabit the stream between the Lofty Reservoir and the Blue Head Reservoir. These species are brook trout, brown trout, and blacknose dace. Six species of fish inhabit the stream below the Blue Head Reservoir: brook trout, blacknose dace, tessellated darters, brown trout, white suckers, and sculpins. However, only the first three species were observed during the 1990 survey of the stream.

Brook trout and sculpins are present in the tributary Negro Hollow.

Recreation
A 1997 report stated that Messers Run was a poor site for angling upstream of the Lofty Reservoir. The same report stated that the stream was an excellent site for angling between the Lofty Reservoir and the Blue Head Reservoir. Additionally, the Pennsylvania State Game Lands Number 308 are in the stream's watershed. These state game lands contain 432 hectares of forested land.

See also
Davis Run, next tributary of Catawissa Creek going downstream
Spies Run, next tributary of Catawissa Creek going upstream
List of tributaries of Catawissa Creek

References

External links
Map of the Catawissa Creek watershed

Rivers of Schuylkill County, Pennsylvania
Tributaries of Catawissa Creek
Rivers of Pennsylvania